Rade Džambić  (born July 14, 1982) is a Serbian former professional basketball player who last played for ZTE KK.

References

External links
 

1982 births
Living people
Basketball League of Serbia players
CSU Asesoft Ploiești players
Iraklis Thessaloniki B.C. players
KK Ergonom players
KK Rabotnički players
NYIT Bears men's basketball players
BKK Radnički players
KK Radnik Bijeljina players
SCM U Craiova (basketball) players
Serbian expatriate basketball people in Bosnia and Herzegovina
Serbian expatriate basketball people in Cyprus
Serbian expatriate basketball people in Greece
Serbian expatriate basketball people in Hungary
Serbian expatriate basketball people in North Macedonia
Serbian expatriate basketball people in Romania
Serbian expatriate basketball people in the United States
Serbian men's basketball players
Texas–Pan American Broncs men's basketball players
ZTE KK players
Guards (basketball)